Mukesh Kumar Yadav is an Indian politician from Bihar and a Member of the Bihar Legislative Assembly. Yadav won the Bajpatti Assembly constituency on the RJD ticket in the 2020 Bihar Legislative Assembly election.

References

Living people
Bihar MLAs 2020–2025
Rashtriya Janata Dal politicians
Year of birth missing (living people)